This is a list of famous or notable people born in, or associated with, Warwick in England.

In birth order:

People from Warwick
Warwick